Elvira Dones (born 1960) is an Albanian novelist, screenwriter, and documentary film producer. Born in the coastal city of Durrës Dones graduated from the State University of Tirana. In 1988 she was employed by Albanian State Television and in this capacity traveled to Switzerland, where she defected. Tried for treason in Albania (in absentia), she was sentenced to prison and denied access to her young son until after the collapse of communism in Albania in 1992. From 1988 until 2004 Dones lived in Switzerland where she worked as a writer and a television journalist, while also writing, directing, and producing several documentaries. Since 2004 she has lived in the United States. The bulk of her writing is in either Italian or Albanian, but several of her documentary films have been subtitled in English. Several of these films have either won or been nominated for various awards. Her most recent documentary, Sworn Virgin, tells the story of women in northern Albania who swear perpetual chastity in their teenage years and become men in their society —not women acting like men or women who have gender reassignment, but simply women who are now men. This film was named the best documentary at the Baltimore Women's Film Festival in 2007.

Selected bibliography

Filmography
 Brunilda (2003)
 I ngujuar (Nailed) (2004)
 Sworn Virgin (2015)

References

External links 
 

Albanian women writers
Albanian women novelists
Albanian novelists
Albanian screenwriters
Albanian atheists
Women screenwriters
1960 births
Living people
20th-century novelists
20th-century women writers
People from Durrës
20th-century Albanian writers
20th-century Albanian women writers